The Place of Peace is a Japanese temple that was dismantled and reconstructed on the campus of Furman University in Greenville, South Carolina.

Origins
The temple was donated to Furman University by Kiyohiro Tsuzuki and his wife, Chigusa. The Tsuzuki family has maintained residency in Nagoya, Japan and Greenville, South Carolina for many decades.

Construction
This Jōdo Shinshū temple was built in Japan in 1984 by Daibun Co. and known as Hei-Sei-Ji (平清治) and Tsuzuki Hondo (都築 本堂). The temple is 900 square feet. However, the temple was never assigned a Buddhist priest to serve a practicing lay community. If this had been the case, then the temple would not have been removed from Japan. The temple was renamed The Place of Peace at Furman and is a learning space to educated students and public about oneness.

In 2004 the Hei-Sei-Ji temple was dismantled into more than 2,400 pieces and shipped in four containers across the Pacific, through the Panama Canal and arrived in Charleston, South Carolina.

Calligraphy
Hanging in the front of the meditation hall (shomen) is a calligraphy scroll of a poem written and brushed by Koichi Tohei. It reads, "信奉宇宙霊感応即現成." David Shaner translated the individual words of the poem as,
 信奉 - shinpo - Blessed, Respectful
 宇宙霊 - uchurei - Universal Spirit
 感応 - kanno - Feeling, Reply
 即 - soku - (particle indicating, "...whatever words come before it and whatever words come after it in the sentence mutually interpenetrate.)
 現成 - genjo - To be present, to be in the "Now"

"Blessed Universal Spirit at this very moment I feel your presence."

Dedication
On September 5, 2008, a dedication was presided over by David E. Shaner, assisted by Jim Eubanks, Abbot, Order of Pragmatic Buddhists. Among the guests were David Emory Shi, President of Furman University; Masanobu Yoshii, Acting Consul General of Japan; Masao Nakajima, President, Aichiken Construction; and Hiroshi Sato, Construction Supervisor.

Major contributors
Major funding provided by Timothy F. Baiden, Bank of America, James E. and Malinda H. Eubanks, Japan World Exposition 70 Commemorative Fund, J. Michael '82 and Elizabeth K. Harley, The Norris Foundation, Margaret C. Robertson '33, Frank '61 and Susan E. Shaw, George W. Willis '48

References

External links
  Website

Furman University
Buildings and structures in Greenville, South Carolina
Jōdo Shin temples
Buddhist temples in the United States
Religious buildings and structures in South Carolina